Liotella cancellata is a species of sea snail, a marine gastropod mollusk in the family Skeneidae.

Description
(Original description by Ferdinand Krauss) The umbilicate shell has an orbicular shape. It is convex, solid, gray-whitish with dirty red stripes.  The transverse ribs are blunt. The irregular, longitudinal striae are  slender. The curve of the penultimate whorl is canceled. The shell has a prominent spire, acute at the apex;. The four whorls increase in size  The body whorl has 26-28 ribs, of which 8-10 are larger, the penultimate whorl only 8, including 3 - 4 larger. These form a lattice with numerous, oblique, longitudinal threads. These are more prominent above but closer to the aperture they become weaker. The oblique aperture is small and almost rounded. The margin of the columella is slightly subreflexed; The umbilicus is smooth.

Distribution
This marine species occurs off Cape of Good Hope, South Africa.

References

 Krauss, Die Südafr. Moll., p. 93, t. 5, f. 26, 1848.

External links
 To World Register of Marine Species

cancellata
Gastropods described in 1848
Taxa named by Christian Ferdinand Friedrich Krauss